The 1961–62 Football League Cup was the second season of the Football League Cup, a knockout competition for England's top 92 football clubs; only 82 of them took part.  The competition began on 11 September 1961, and ended with the two-legged final on 26 April and 1 May 1962.

The tournament was won by Norwich City, who beat Rochdale 4–0 on aggregate over two legs. Norwich won the first leg 3–0 away at Spotland, thanks to goals from Derrick Lythgoe (2) and Punton. In the second leg at Carrow Road, Jimmy Hill  scored to give Norwich a 1–0 win on the night and a 4–0 aggregate victory.

Match dates and results were initially drawn from Soccerbase, and they were later checked against Rothmans Football Yearbook 1970–71.

Calendar
Semi-finals and final were played over two legs.

First round

Ties

Replays

Byes
These two teams received byes as they were competing in the 1961–62 European Cup Winners' Cup.

Second round

Ties

Replays

Third round

Ties

Replays

2nd Replay

Bye

Fourth round

Ties

Replay

Byes

Fifth round

Ties

Replay

Semi-finals

First leg

Second leg

Final 

The final was played over two legs. The first leg was held at Spotland, Rochdale on 26 April 1962, and the second leg was held at Carrow Road, Norwich, on 1 May 1962.

Rochdale: Burgin — Milburn, Winton, Bodell, Aspden, James Thompson, Wragg, Hepton, Bimpson, Cairns, Whitaker.

Norwich City: Kennon — McCrohan, Ashman, Burton, Barry Butler, Mullett, Mannion, Lythgoe, Scott, James Hill, Punton.

Norwich City: Kennon — McCrohan, Ashman, Burton, Barry Butler, Mullett, Mannion, Lythgoe, Scott, James Hill, Punton.

Rochdale: Burgin — Milburn, Winton, Bodell, Aspden, James Thompson, Whyke, Joe Richardson, Bimpson, Cairns, Whitaker.

Norwich City  won the League Cup final 4–0 on aggregate.

References

EFL Cup seasons
1961–62 domestic association football cups
Lea
Cup